The Hirth F-36 is a single-cylinder, two-stroke, carburetted aircraft engine designed for use on ultralight aircraft, especially powered paragliders and ultralight trikes. It is noted for its extremely small equipped weight of  including exhaust system, reduction drive and carburetor. It is manufactured by Hirth of Germany.

The F-36 was formerly known as the Solo 210, before the design was purchased by Hirth.

Development
The engine uses free air cooling, single capacitor discharge ignition, with a single integral pump-type carburetor. The cylinder walls are electrochemically coated with Nikasil. Standard starting is recoil start with electric start optional. A quadruple V belt reduction drive system is an option with ratios of 1.8:1, 2.0:1 or 2.5:1.

The engine runs on a 50:1 pre-mix of unleaded 93 octane auto fuel and oil and produces  at 6000 rpm.

Applications

Specifications (F-36)

References

External links

Hirth aircraft engines
Solo aircraft engines
Air-cooled aircraft piston engines
Two-stroke aircraft piston engines